Broadview College, formerly Utah Career College, is a private for-profit college in West Jordan, Utah. It primarily awards associate degrees.

History

Broadview College, originally The Bryman School, and later Utah Career College, was founded in downtown Salt Lake City  in 1977. In 1988, the school moved to a more central location for Salt Lake City Valley, 1144 West 3300 South. In October 2000, Utah Career College moved to its current location in West Jordan, Utah, and in 2005 expanded into additional space to accommodate growth. In 2006, the school began offering bachelor's degrees.  In 2007, UCC opened a branch campus in Layton. In 2008, it opened a campus in Orem and began offering fully online programs through its West Jordan campus. In 2013, the institution changed its name to Broadview University and added campuses in Salt Lake City, Utah and Boise, Idaho. At that time it added master's degrees and entertainment arts programs to its curriculum.

The institution was granted permission to award associate of applied science degrees in 1996, bachelor of science degrees in 2006, and bachelor of fine arts degrees, Master of Science in Management degrees and Master of Business Administration degrees in 2010.

In the winter of 2011 the Salt Lake campus became Broadview Entertainment Arts University (BEAU), focusing exclusively on entertainment arts and adding additional programs.

In 2016, Broadview closed their Orem, Layton, and Boise campuses.

In February 2018, students were informed that Broadview Entertainment Arts University (BEAU) was closing its Salt Lake City campus at the end of the year.

References

External links
 Official website

Private universities and colleges in Utah
Private universities and colleges in Idaho
For-profit universities and colleges in the United States
Educational institutions established in 1977
Buildings and structures in Boise, Idaho
Schools in Salt Lake City
Universities and colleges in Salt Lake County, Utah
1977 establishments in Utah